Djurås is a locality and the seat of Gagnef Municipality in Dalarna County, Sweden. It had 1,278 inhabitants in 2010.

References 

Municipal seats of Dalarna County
Swedish municipal seats
Populated places in Dalarna County
Populated places in Gagnef Municipality